Eslamabad-e Olya (also Romanized as Eslāmābād-e ‘Olyā; also known as Eslāmābād and Tol Chāh) is a village in Howmeh Rural District, in the Central District of Behbahan County, Khuzestan Province, Iran. At the 2006 census, its population was 1,404, in 264 families.

References 

Populated places in Behbahan County